Bolam may refer to:

Places
England
Bolam, County Durham
Bolam, Northumberland
Bolam West Houses, Northumberland

Other uses
Bolam (surname)
The Bolam Test, used to determine professional negligence

See also
Bank of London and Montreal, known as BOLAM